Walter Wolf is a Croatian brand of cigarettes.

History

The brand was introduced in the 1990s during the Yugoslav Wars. With the movement of refugees to Central Europe, it was introduced into the trade.

Pack design
The design of the logo, a striking red W with the stylised injected relief of a Wolf, emerged in the 1970s in Switzerland. From the 2000s onwards, the design has been processed to the intellectual property rights.

The design of the packaging is dark blue with gold lettering and the words "Walter Wolf". The design remained virtually unchanged until 2012, but there came a bit more room for variation of the brand name for trade reasons.

The cigarettes carry the name of the Austrian entrepreneur Walter Wolf. The distinctive logo was also used in the Formula 1 racing team Walter Wolf Racing, as well as for perfumes.

Sponsorship

Formula 1
The brand was the main sponsor of the Formula 1 team with the similar name, Walter Wolf Racing, from its debut in 1977 until its departure in 1979.

Markets
Walter Wolf cigarettes were or still are sold in the following countries: Austria, Slovenia, Croatia, Bosnia and Herzegovina, Serbia and Bulgaria.

See also

 Tobacco smoking
 Drina (cigarette)
 Elita (cigarette)
 Filter 57 (cigarette)
 Jadran (cigarette)
 Laika (cigarette)
 Lovćen (cigarette)
 Morava (cigarette)
 Partner (cigarette)
 Smart (cigarette)
 Time (cigarette)
 Sobranie
 Jin Ling
 LD (cigarette)

References

Cigarette brands